This is a list of the French SNEP Top 50 Singles number-one singles of 1990.

Summary

Singles chart

See also
1990 in music
List of number-one hits (France)
List of artists who reached number one on the French Singles Chart

References

1990 in French music
1990 record charts
Lists of number-one songs in France